Nerolidol, also known as peruviol and penetrol , is a naturally occurring sesquiterpene alcohol. A colorless liquid, it is found in the essential oils of many types of plants and flowers.  There are four isomers of nerolidol', which differ in the geometry about the internal double bonds, but most applications use such a mixture.  The aroma of nerolidol is woody and reminiscent of fresh bark. It is used as a flavoring agent and in perfumery as well as in non-cosmetic products such as detergents and cleansers. Nerolidyl derivatives include nerolidyl diphosphate and the fragrance nerolidyl acetate.

Synthesis and occurrence
Nerolidol is produced commercially from geranylacetone by the addition of vinyl Grignard reagent. It is used as a source of farnesol, vitamin E, and vitamin K1.

Significant sources of natural nerolidol is Cabreuva oil and the oil of Dalbergia parviflora. It is also present in neroli, ginger, jasmine, lavender, tea tree, Cannabis sativa, and lemon grass, and is a dominant scent compound in Brassavola nodosa.

Further reading

See also
 Linalool
 Farnesol

References

Tertiary alcohols
Perfume ingredients
Flavors
Sesquiterpenes